Philip L. Kohl (September 20, 1946 – May 11, 2022) was a professor of Anthropology at Wellesley College.

Biography 
Kohl grew up in Chicago in 1946. His parents were Commonwealth Edison employees and the family lived in South Shore, Chicago. He graduated from St. Ignatius College Prep in 1964 and enrolled in College of the Holy Cross for one year before dropping out. 

Returning home to Chicago, Kohl worked at Marshall Field's while attending the University of Chicago at night. Kohl received his B.A. in Greek and Latin from Columbia University in 1969 and his Ph.D. in Anthropology from Harvard University in 1974. He also worked part time at the Goddard Institute for Space Studies as an undergraduate at Columbia. His doctoral thesis focused on commodity trade in Southwest Asia during the Bronze Age.

From 1974 to 2016, Kohl taught at Wellesley College. He is the author of many books, 140 articles and reviews on the archaeology of the Ancient Near East and has conducted fieldwork in Iran, Afghanistan, Central Asia, Armenia, Azerbaijan, Georgia, and Russia. He was a member of the editorial board of the scholarly journal Antiguo Oriente.

Selected bibliography

External links

References

1946 births
2022 deaths
American anthropologists
Harvard University alumni
Wellesley College faculty
Date of birth missing

Columbia University School of General Studies alumni
St. Ignatius College Prep alumni
College of the Holy Cross alumni
University of Chicago alumni
Academics from Chicago